Amresh Ganesh is an Indian actor, film composer and singer, who has worked in Tamil language films. The son of actress Jayachitra, Amresh appeared as an actor in his mother's productions Pudhiya Raagam (1991) and then in Naane Ennul Illai (2010), before working as a music composer in the late 2010s.

Career
Amresh Ganesh was born to industrialist Ganesh and film actress Jayachitra, with the actress launching him as a child artiste in Pudhiya Raagam (1991) before relaunching him as an actor several years later. Amresh first gained attention by composing for a four-language music album titled Jeevitham, which was released in 2008 and featured singers including S. P. Balasubrahmanyam, Karthik and Sujatha. Despite Jayachitra directing his debut through Naane Ennul Illai (2010), the film's failure made it difficult for Amresh to succeed as an actor. In 2011, it was announced that he would work on projects titled Kaliyuga Kadhalan and Machan Ava En Aalu Da, with the former being set in three different eras, but neither film was completed. Later in the year, Jayachitra announced that she was working on three more films with Amresh in the lead role, Mundru Mugangal, Nedunchalai and Scene Podathey, but again neither film materialised. He also shot for a comedy film titled Kadan Vaangi Kalyanam alongside Mansoor Ali Khan during late 2011, but the film also did not release. In 2013, he briefly worked on the making of another incomplete film Thaaru Maaru, which had a grand launch event.

In 2015, he was signed on by producer R. B. Choudary and director Sai Ramani to work on the music for the film, Motta Shiva Ketta Shiva (2017) starring Raghava Lawrence. Prior to the release of the film, actor Tinku released a video alleging that Amresh had stolen a song titled "Hara Hara Mahadevaki" from a film that he and Robert were making titled Thaathaa Car-ai Thodadhae. Tinku alleged that Amresh had worked together with them to create the song during early 2015, but production troubles had shelved the film and subsequently Amresh had taken the song to a different project. In a press meet in February 2017, Amresh Ganesh refuted the claims and provided evidence of Tinku and Robert continuously trying to scam him by gathering funds for the shelved project. Amresh stated that he had developed the song free of cost and had paid for the duo to take part in a failed shoot of the song in Bangkok, before the film was stalled. Moreover, Amresh revealed that Robert had owned up to playing the song to music composer Srikanth Deva, and had attempted to include it in another shelved film titled Minor Kunju Kaanom which Tinku, Robert and Srikanth Deva were involved in.

His next releases will be Pottu, the Trisha-starrer Garjanai and the Prabhu Deva-starrer Yung Mung Sung.

Personal life
He married Keerthi Hanusha on 19 October 2016. Their daughter was born on 31 March 2019.

Filmography

Discography

Released soundtracks
 The year next to the title of the affected films indicates the release year of the either dubbed or remade version in the named language later than the original version.
 • indicates original language release. Indicates simultaneous makes, if featuring in more languages
 ♦ indicates a remade version, the remaining ones being dubbed versions

Upcoming projects

Singer

References

External links
 

Living people
Musicians from Chennai
20th-century Indian male actors
Tamil film score composers
Male actors from Chennai
Tamil playback singers
Indian male playback singers
Tamil male actors
Male actors in Tamil cinema
Indian male child actors
1988 births
Indian male film score composers